Convertine was a 36-gun fourth rate vessel captured from the Portuguese by the Commonwealth of England. She was commissioned into the Parliamentary Naval Force as Convertine. During the First Anglo-Dutch War she partook in the Battle of Dungeness, Battle of Portland and the Battle of the Gabbard. During the Second Anglo-Dutch War she participated in the Battle of Lowestoft and the Four Days' Battle. She was captured during the Four Days' Battle.

Convertine was the second named vessel since it was used for a 36-gun vessel named Destiny built at Woolwich in 1616 and renamed Convertine in 1620, captured by Royalist forces in 1648 and sold at Lisbon in 1650.

Specifications
She was captured by Tiger in October 1650 in the River Tagus in Portugal. Her builder's measure tonnage was calculated as  tons. She was lengthened in 1653.

Her gun armament at the end of 1653 was 44 guns and had dropped to 40 guns by 1660. In 1666 her armament was 52 (wartime)/44 (peacetime) and consisted of twenty-four culverins, twenty 8-pounder guns, eight sakers. Her manning was 180 personnel in March 1652 and rose to 210 personnel by the end of 1653 (becoming a Third Rate briefly) and was established as 190/140/110 personnel.

Commissioned Service

Service in the English Civil War and Commonwealth Navy
She was commissioned into the Parliamentary Navy in 1651 under the command of Captain Abraham Wheeler. Later in 1651 she was under Captain John Holden.

First Anglo-Dutch War
At the start of the First Anglo-Dutch War she partook in the Battle of Kentish Knock on 28 September 1652 followed by the Battle of Dungeness on 29 November 1652. Before the end of the year Captain John Lambert took command. In 1653 she was under the command of Captain Anthony Joyne was her commander. She partook in the Battle of Portland on 18 February 1653. As a member of Blue Squadron, Rear Division she took part in the Battle of the Gabbard on 2–3 June 1653. After being lengthened, she spent the winter 1653/54 at Harwich under the command of John Hayward. She then sailed with Penn's Fleet to the West Indies on 25 December 1654. She participated in the attack on San Domingo on 13 April 1655 Afterwards she was under the command of Thomas Wilks. She sailed for Jamaica in 1660.

Service after the Restoration May 1660
After the Restoration she was under the command of Captain John Povey and sailed to the East Indies. Captain John Pearce took command on 8 September 1664..

Second Anglo-Dutch War
At the Battle of Lowestoft on 3 June 1665, she was a member of Red Squadron, Center Division. She arrived on 3 June 1666 as reinforcement for White Squadron Van Division at the Four Days' Battle.

Loss
Convertine was captured by two Dutch warships on 4 June 1666, the last day of the Four Days' Battle.

Notes

Citations

References

 British Warships in the Age of Sail (1603 – 1714), by Rif Winfield, published by Seaforth Publishing, England © Rif Winfield 2009, EPUB :
 Fleet Actions, 1.3 Battle of Kentish Knock
 Fleet Actions, 1.4 Battle of Dungeness
 Fleet Actions, 1.5 Battle off Portland
 Fleet Actions, 1.7 Battle of the Gabbard
 Fleet Actions, 3.1 Battle of Lowestoft
 Fleet Actions, 3.3 Battle of the Galloper Sand (the Four Days' Battle)
 Chapter 4 Fourth Rates - 'Small Ships', Vessels acquired from 25 March 1603, Ex-Portuguese Prizes (1650), Convertine
 Colledge, Ships of the Royal Navy, by J.J. Colledge, revised and updated by Lt-Cdr Ben Warlow and Steve Bush, published by Seaforth Publishing, Barnsley, Great Britain, © the estate of J.J. Colledge, Ben Warlow and Steve Bush 2020, EPUB , Section C (Convertine)
 Lavery, The Arming and Fitting of English Ships of War 1800 - 1815, by Brian Lavery, published by US Naval Institute Press (C) 1989, Part V Guns, Type of Guns

Ships of the line of the Royal Navy
1650s ships
Ships of the English navy